The Robinson R22 is a two-seat, two-bladed, single-engined, light utility helicopter manufactured by Robinson Helicopter Company. It was designed in 1973 by Frank D. Robinson, and has been in production since 1979.

Development
The majority of flight testing was performed at Zamperini Field in Torrance, California. Flight testing and certification were performed in the late 1970s by test pilot Joseph John "Tym" Tymczyszyn, and the R22 received FAA certification in March 1979.
Due to relatively low acquisition and operating costs, the R22 has been popular as a primary rotorcraft trainer around the world, and as a livestock-management tool on large ranches in North America and cattle stations in Australia.

The R22 has a very low-inertia rotor system and the control inputs are operated directly by push rods with no hydraulic assistance. Thus, its flight controls are very sensitive and require a light touch to avoid overcorrection, and students who master an R22 are usually well prepared to transition to heavier helicopters. Due to the specific training required by the low-inertia rotor system and a teetering main rotor, operation of the Robinson R22 or R44 in the US requires a special endorsement by a certified flight instructor. Tip weights were added to the R22 to increase rotor inertia, but the small rotor limits weight.

Design

The R22 is a light, two-place, single reciprocating-engined helicopter, with a semirigid, two-bladed main rotor and a two-bladed tail rotor. The main rotor has a teetering hinge and two coning hinges. The tail rotor has only a teetering hinge.

The normal production variant has skid landing gear. The Mariner version, no longer manufactured, provided floats. Wheeled gear is not available.

The basic structure is welded chromoly steel tubing. The forward fuselage is made of fiberglass and aluminum with a Plexiglas canopy.  The tailcone and vertical and horizontal stabilizers are aluminum. It has an enclosed cabin with side-by-side seating for a pilot and passenger. The doors may be removed for flight, as is often done for photographic flights, interior cooling in high temperatures, or a 10.4 lb weight saving.

The first version was produced as the R22, followed by the R22 HP, R22 Alpha, R22 Beta, and R22 Beta II. Superficially, the aircraft appear similar. The steel-tube frame on the R22 Alpha was modified by extending the aft landing-gear mounting points, giving it a slightly nose-down attitude on the ground and better matching of the skids to the ground in a low-altitude hover with two people on board. The R22 Beta added an engine speed governor (optional), rotor brake, and auxiliary fuel tank (optional). The battery was moved from below the instrument cluster to the engine compartment for better balance. The R22 has been offered as an instrument trainer version, with optional fixed floats as the R22 Mariner, and other special configurations for police work, electronic news gathering, and so on. The R22 Beta II received a larger Lycoming O-360 engine derated for sea-level operation. It allows greater altitudes for hovering in and out of ground effect (HIGE/HOGE). The R22 Beta II also made the engine speed governor standard and included a carburetor heat assist, which correlates adding carburetor heat with a decrease in collective control. Only the basic skid style is currently being sold.

Controls

Instead of floor-mounted cyclic sticks between the pilot's knees, the R22 uses a unique teetering "T-Bar" control connected to a stick that emerges from the console between the seats. This makes it easier for occupants to enter and exit the cabin and reduces chances for injury in the event of a hard landing. The teetering bar has a hand grip on both sides that hangs down between the pilots' legs. Thus, if teetered to the right, the right-side pilot would be flying and the left grip would be about 12 inches above the left pilot's lap. R22 flight instructors quickly learn how to fly with their hand in the air. The left part of the bar, left collective control, and left tail-rotor pedals can be removed if the left-seat occupant is not certified to fly the R22 or if the space is needed for technical or observer duties. A floor-mounted, foot-activated push-to-talk switch facilitates intercom communications for the left-seat occupant, although some later models may be equipped with a voice-activated intercom system.

The helicopter rotor system consists of a two-bladed main rotor and two-bladed antitorque rotor on the tail, each equipped with a teetering hinge. The main rotor is also equipped with two coning hinges. Collective and cyclic pitch inputs to the main rotor are transmitted through pushrods and a conventional swashplate mechanism. Control inputs to the preconed tail rotor are transmitted through a single pushrod inside the aluminum tail cone.

To ease the pilot's workload, a mechanical throttle correlator adjusts the throttle as the collective pitch control is raised or lowered.  The pilot needs to make only small adjustments by twisting the throttle grip on the collective throughout the flight regimen.  Later models are also equipped with an electronic governor, which works to maintain engine speed within normal operating limits (between 97 and 104%); the governor is active when the engine is running only above 80% of socified speed, and is most effective in normal flight conditions.  The governor can be switched on or off with a toggle switch located at the end of the pilot's collective pitch control. When the governor is not engaged, a yellow caution light glows on the instrument panel.

Powerplant

The R22 uses a horizontally mounted Lycoming O-320 (O-360-J2A on the Beta II), flat-four, air-cooled, normally aspirated, carburetor-equipped, reciprocating engine.  It is fueled with 100LL grade aviation gasoline.  Cooling is provided through a direct-drive, squirrel-cage cooling fan.  At sea level, it is derated, or operated at less than maximum power, which has been attributed to the company wishing for the power unit to maintain the same performance at sea level as it does at altitude.  As the air becomes thinner with increasing altitude, maximum available horsepower decreases, reaching a point where the throttle can be completely open and rotor speed is controlled by collective lever position.  By derating the engine at sea level, the R22 achieves acceptable high-altitude performance without use of supercharging or turbocharging, thus saving the weight, cost, complexity, unreliability, and shortened engine life of a forced induction system.

A carburetor is used to provide the air-fuel mixture.  Carbureted engines are susceptible to carburetor icing, a condition most likely to occur in conditions of a low 11 °C (20 °F) difference  between the outside air temperature and dew point (the "dew point spread"), as well as visible signs of moisture in the atmosphere.  Icing can lead to loss of engine power, and if not corrected, total shutdown of the engine.  A carburetor heat control is used to supply heated air to the carburetor; this can prevent or cure icing, but also causes a reduction in engine power output because hot air is less dense, enriching the fuel-air mixture.  The carburetor heat control is a simple plunger-type control mounted on the center console near the collective pitch control lever. Pulling the control up slides a gate valve near the carburetor that admits warm air from a scoop on the exhaust system. The R22 employs a carburetor air temperature gauge, marked to indicate temperatures conducive to icing. The Beta II version of the R22 also includes a "carburetor heat assist", which automatically applies carburetor heat when the collective lever is lowered below a certain point. When icing conditions are present, carburetor heat is required to prevent icing around the butterfly valve from the pressure drop at that point.  As the carburetor air temperature (CAT) indicator does not read correctly below 18 in Hg (457 mm Hg) of intake manifold air pressure, icing conditions require applying full carburetor heat below 18 in Hg of manifold pressure.  A placard indicating this requirement is located on the CAT indicator and in the pilot's operating handbook.

Power is transmitted from the engine to the drive system through drive belts.  Originally, the R22 used four separate v-belts running on multigroove sheaves. This system proved problematic, as individual belts sometimes rolled over in their groove and fail.  As a temporary measure, in 1982, R22 operators received a kit from Robinson that was installed in the cockpit and on the belt tension actuator, isolating the tensioning circuits and locking the clutch/drive system at take-off tension. The problem was ultimately solved by replacing the four individual v-belts with two dual v-belts. The upper, driven sheave is mounted on the main/tail rotor drive shaft incorporating flexible couplings, and is raised and lowered relative to the engine-mounted, driving sheave by means of a belt tension actuator.  During shutdown, the actuator is used to lower the upper sheave to loosen the drive belts.  For startup, the engine is started with the belts loose, allowing the engine to run without spinning the rotor system.  Immediately after engine start, the clutch switch located in the cockpit is closed by the pilot, powering the actuator to slowly raise the upper sheave to flight position, which tightens the belts.  The actuator is thereafter controlled by pressure-sensing column springs, automatically maintaining proper belt tension during flight as the belts wear and stretch. The shaft on which the upper sheave is mounted drives both the main and tail rotors; the main gear box delivers power to the main rotor shaft through a set of splash-lubricated spiral bevel gears.

A one-way sprag clutch is built into the center of the upper sheave to allow the rotor system to continue to rotate in the event of engine failure, allowing the R22 to enter autorotation and land in a controlled manner. Because the main rotor has very little mass and inertia, autorotation in an R22 requires careful and proper execution to assure a successful outcome. Much time is spent in training practicing various types of autorotation.

Transport

The two-bladed rotor and the small size of the R22 make transporting the helicopter without blade folding or dismantling tasks possible. Transporting the R22 requires securing the tail boom and rotor blades to a truck or trailer bed, which must be torsionally rigid to prevent motion and stresses being applied to the helicopter during transportation.  Take off and landing directly onto a trailer is possible.

Variants
R22
The initial production version, it is powered by a Lycoming O-320-A2B or A2C piston engine.
R22 HP
A higher-powered version, it has a 160 bhp Lycoming O-320-B2C piston engine.
R22 Alpha
This improved version, certified in 1983, is powered by a Lycoming O-320-B2C piston engine.
 
Fitted with a more powerful engine, it is powered by a Lycoming O-320-B2C piston engine.
R22 Beta II
Fitted with a more powerful engine, it is powered by a Lycoming O-360-J2A piston engine.
R22 Beta II Police
This police patrol version is equipped with a searchlight and loudspeaker.
R22 Mariner
Designed for off-shore work, it is fitted with floats and a Lycoming O-320-B2C piston engine, and is limited to daylight operations when fitted with floats.
R22 Mariner II
Designed for off-shore work, it is fitted with floats and a Lycoming O-360-J2A piston engine, andis limited to daylight operations when fitted with floats.
R22 Police
Police version
R22 IFR
Designed for IFR training, it has a larger, 10-hole panel to accommodate additional instruments. It is not IFR certified, so training must be done with a safety pilot in VFR conditions.
Maverick UAV
Unmanned military version marketed by Boeing
Renegade UAV
Unmanned R&D version built for DARPA

Unmanned derivatives
The R22 is the basis for Boeing's Maverick military unmanned aerial vehicle helicopter, and its Renegade version. In 1999, Frontier Systems developed a remotely piloted R22, the Maverick. This aircraft, along with the company, was later acquired by Boeing Phantom Works. In 2003, the United States Navy purchased four aircraft, equipped with Wescam electro-optical/infrared systems.

Boeing then modified one of the Mavericks further, calling it the Renegade, under contract with the Defense Advanced Research Projects Agency as a research testbed to develop software for its A160 Hummingbird. The software system, known as the software enabled control (SEC) program, was developed by Boeing and teams from the University of California, Berkeley, Georgia Institute of Technology, and Massachusetts Institute of Technology, and was first flown on May 26, 2005. During the flight, the SEC assumed control of the aircraft to "execute autonomous maneuvering algorithms". The software allows the aircraft to autonomously select "optimal routes through a field of pop-up and known threats; flying low-level, terrain-hugging profiles to avoid detection; and determining safe landing zones using vision-based algorithms to process landing site imagery and terrain height information."

Operators

The R22 is operated by many private individuals, companies, and flying clubs. In Australia, where 489 R22s were registered as of mid-2011, a survey found that 62% of the fleet's flying time was in mustering operations, while 13% of hours were spent in training pilots. Many broadcasters used the R22 until the mid-1990s, when the financial landscape of radio broadcasting in the U.S. changed due to deregulation of the industry.

Military 

Croatian Police
 
 Dominican Republic Army
 
 Philippine Navy

Accidents and incidents 
Since the R22 received FAA certification in March 1979, Robinson has delivered 4620 R22 helicopters. The R22 had 182 fatal accidents between March 1979 and June 2010 from a total of 1230 incidents. In late 1981, the R22 had its type certificate temporarily revoked by the Federal Aviation Administration due to delamination of a main rotor blade. The cause of the delamination was determined to be contamination of one of the bonded parts during a priming operation performed at an outside vendor. In response, Robinson Helicopter Company instituted stringent quality procedures and requirements, and replaced all main rotor blades on the fleet of 33 helicopters in service at the time.

In the early 1980s, the R22 experienced a number of student-pilot related accidents due to the R22's use as a primary flight trainer. Believing the number of accidents was the result of insufficient training and lax standards, Robinson established the Robinson Pilot Safety Course in 1982 to educate Certified Flight Instructors transitioning from larger helicopters to the new, smaller R22. After the introduction of the Robinson Pilot Safety Course, the rate of fatal R22 accidents declined from 3.7 per 100,000 flight hours in 1983 to 0.97 per 100,000 flight hours for the 12 months preceding July 1995. Robinson's statistics show the rate of fatal R22 accidents per 100,000 flight hours fell from 6.0 in 1982 to 0.7 in 1997. As of 2012, more than 17,000 students have gone through the course.

R22 cost
The R22 has a suggested retail price of $318,000 (ex factory price, USA) and the value on the second-hand market is dependent on component time in service.

Operating cost, per the factory, including insurance, reserve for overhaul, and direct operating cost (fuel, oil, inspections, unscheduled maintenance) is US$163.71/hr.

A full overhaul of major components is required at 2200 hours (or 12 years, whichever comes first), which is sometimes known as "Timex".

Depreciation on a Robinson R22 is negligible, as freshly overhauled R22s typically sell for more than the original cost. However, a provision per flown hour must be made for a "reserve for overhaul" cost, currently estimated at US$72.21 per hour. (Total approximate overhaul cost: ~$72.21 x 2200 Hours = ~US$158,862)

The Robinson price list is updated in February each year.

Specifications (R22)

See also

References

External links

 Robinson Helicopter Company web site
 Robinson Helicopter Owners Group
 Frank Robinson and development of the R22
 EASA Type Certificate Data Sheet - R22/R22 ALPHA/R22 BETA/R22 MARINER 

1970s United States helicopters
1970s United States civil utility aircraft
R22
Single-engined piston helicopters
Aircraft first flown in 1975